Wijayatunga Mudalige Harischandra Wijayatunga (born 25 October 1931) is a Sri Lankan author, translator, lexicographer, teacher, lawyer and politician. He held various offices in different institutions of the Government of Sri Lanka. At present he is the leader of Sinhalaye Mahasammatha Bhoomiputra Party. During the presidential elections of 1994 and 1999, he was the candidate of that party for this high office.

He is the compiler of the Practical Sinhala Dictionary (1982) and Gunasena Great Sinhala Dictionary, which are considered as the most comprehensive Sinhala-Sinhala dictionaries to date. Besides compiling these voluminous works of over 2000 pages, he also proposed scientific ideas to standardise Sinhala script.

His political philosophy is Mahasammatavada ('Great Consensus' or comprehensive consultation): consulting all people which he described "as going beyond democracy".

Early life 
Harischandra Wijayatunga was born in 1931 at Madamulla in Minuwangoda, Sri Lanka. His father, Wijayatunga Mudalige Don Bastian Wijayatunga, was an Ayurvedic eye physician, landed proprietor and a planter (coconut and paddy) and his mother was Amarawathie Jayasinghe. Wijayatunga was the fourth in a family of eight siblings.

Wijayatunga received his elementary education at the Government Bilingual School in Minuwangoda. When the Nalanda College Colombo was relocated to Minuwangoda during the World War II, as a security measure, his parents took the opportunity to shift him to that school. After the War Nalanda College Colombo was taken back to Colombo, and Wijayatnga continued his studies at Nalanda College Colombo. Some of Wijayatunga's notable classmates at Nalanda College were Karunaratne Abeysekera, Dr Hudson Silva, Hon. Dr Dharmasena Attygalle, Hon. Rupa Karunathilake, Ravindra Rupasena and Stanley Jayasinghe.

In 1952 he entered the University of Ceylon and in 1955 graduated with a bachelor's degree in science.

For his thesis "Legal Philosophy in Medieval Sinhale" he was awarded the PhD degree by the University of Kelaniya in 1990.

On his 90th birthday (25 October 2021), Dr Harischandra Wijayatunga was felicitated by Nalanda College, Colombo in a programme called Harisanda Harasara when two books ‘Abhinandana Special Issue’ and ‘Margagatha Abhinandana Sambhashanaya 2021’ were also launched.

Career 

Immediately after his University education, Wijayatunga joined the staff of Dharmaraja College, Kandy as a science teacher. In addition, he also taught chemistry at the Mahamaya Girls' College, Kandy. It was during this time that he wrote his first book Miridiya Jivihu (Freshwater Life). In 1956 he was appointed as the Editor of the Science Section of the Sinhala Encyclopaedia, established at the University of Peradeniya.  After some years of service there, he assumed the post of vice-Principal of his former work place, Dharmaraja College.

In 1965 he was appointed to the Sri Lanka Standards Institution (SLSI) which started work in the same year. He was the first and the only member appointed to the staff, functioning as its Secretary. Under his supervision Divisional Committees on Electrical Engineering, Mechanical Engineering, Civil Engineering, Agriculture and Chemicals, and Metrication of Sri Lanka were appointed.

The next step he took was to join the Sri Lanka Law College as a student. He took his oaths as an Attorney-at-Law in 1973.

He appeared for the accused in the 1971 insurrection before the Criminal Justice Commission. It is also noteworthy that he represented several parties at the Presidential Commission headed by the former Chief Justice Mr. M. C. Sansoni.

Throughout the 1980s he held various offices such as Chief Editor of the tabloid Sinhala Bauddhya (The Sinhalese Buddhist), director, Sri Lanka Ayurvedic Drugs Corporation and member of the Directorate of the Siddhayurveda College, Gampaha. During the years 1984–1990, he was the Editor-in-Chief of the Sinhalese Encyclopaedia as well as the Officer-in-Charge, Sinhala version of the Legislative Enactments of Sri Lanka.

Political career 

Wijayatunga's political career goes back to his university days. He joined in the popular movement in 1950s to make Sinhala the Official Language of Sri Lanka, calling into life the "Sinhala Union of the University of Ceylon". During his stay in Kandy he associated himself with the work of Sri Lanka Freedom Party. Realising that none of the two major parties in Sri Lanka would espouse the rights of Sinhalese Buddhists, which was uppermost in his mind, he established the Sinhalaye Mahasammatha Bhoomiputra Pakshaya in 1990 with a group of intellectuals. He became the leader of this party and holds this position to this date.

In the third 1994 Sri Lankan presidential election, he was the candidate of his Party and polled 32,651 votes. Six years later, he contested again in the presidential elections of 1999, polling 35,854 votes. He also contested in the parliamentary elections of 2000, 2001 and 2004.

Political sacrifice 
Mahinda Rajapaksa won the 2005 Presidential election with slightly over 180,000 votes. Prior to the 2005 Presidential election, the government was considerably unpopular due to the escalation of hopeless civil war, economic collapse, and also due to the Millennium City incident. 

Dr. Harischandra Wijayatunga did not contest the 2005 Presidential election intentionally by calculating the consequence to Sri Lanka if contested, but instead supported Mahinda Rajapaksa to win the Presidential election. 

If Dr. Harischandra Wijayatunga had contested, the outcome of the 2005 Presidential election would have been more complicated due to the unpopularity of the then government and Mahinda Rajapaksa may have lost by a narrow margin resulting in the possibility of the war being dragged on further. 

In 2009 with the leadership of Mahinda Rajapaksa the 26 year civil war ended in the defeat of the LTTE.

It was only Dr. Harischandra Wijayatunga who advocated that the war could and should be ended by combat since early 1990.

Higher education in Sinhala for the masses 

For the 1956 General Election, Mr. S. W. R. D. Bandaranaike promised to Sinhalese Buddhists that if his party could set up the government, he would make Sinhala the only state language within 24hrs. However, Mr. S. W. R. D. Bandaranaike did not honor the promise made to the people. Months after the 1956 General Election, Prof. F. R. Jayasuriya started a fast unto death to force S. W. R. D. Bandaranaike's government to implement the promise with the support of Mr. Harischandra Wijayatunga and other extremists.

Mr. Harischandra Wijayatunga openly supported and publicly promoted the fast unto death by Prof. F. R. Jayasuriya, to force then S. W. R. D. Bandaranaike government to implement Sinhala as the only State language.

Cabinet of the S. W. R. D. Bandaranaike government agreed with Prof. F. R. Jayasuriya to make Sinhala as the only state language, this resulted for the masses to obtain higher education in Sinhala.

Prior to 1956, higher education was available in English for the English speaking elite in few colleges, and it was only the primary education given to masses in Sinhala language. The most important result was that the Sinhalese Buddhist masses got a chance to study beyond primary education up to advanced level in Sinhala. This effort resulted in Sinhala medium schools to produce the country's engineers, doctors, public servants, police, military and other higher positions.

"Several countries that achieved remarkable economic progress in the 80s and 90s, Japan, South Korea, Thailand, Malaysia and Taiwan, used their own native languages as the official language.

In fact the use of the native language helped these countries to tap into their vast national resources, human and otherwise, for development. We also observe that countries like Israel, Norway, Denmark, and Iceland with a population lower than that of Sri Lanka but with a very high levels of development, continue to use their native languages as the official languages in their countries."

Personal life 
Wijayatunga was married to Kalukapuge Karuna Perera (B.A., Dip. Ed., Attorney-at-Law, Notary Public and Commissioner of Oaths) of Kiribathgoda, who died in 2000. Karuna's father, a Kalukapuge Bandaranaike, adopted the surname Perera during British colonial time. One of the descendant of the male lineage of the Kalukapuge Bandaranaike family is the fourth Prime Minister of Ceylon, S.W.R.D. Bandaranaike. Karuna's both parents were school principals.

Wijayatunga and Karuna are the parents of three sons (Widyasagara, b. 1965, Chakrapani, b. 1967 and Chandrakeerthi, b. 1970) and a daughter (Shyama Kumari, b. 1969). He has travelled widely in many Asian, African and European countries, and was invited to address various groups of learned societies in India, Japan, UK and Australia.

Works by Harischandra Wijayatunga 
Science works
 මිරිදිය ජීවිහු (1955)
 ජ්‍යේෂ්‍ඨ රසායන විද්යාව (1956)
 පොළොවේ කථාන්තරය (1959)

Translations
 බ්‍රව්‍නිං සහ ජෝසෆ් ලියූ ප්‍රායෝගික රසායන විද්යාව - ජ්‍යේෂ්‍ඨ රසායන විද්යාව (1956)
 ඩරන්ට් ගේ කාබනික රසායනය (1963)
 මාඕ සේතුං ගේ කලාව හා සාහිත්යය (1963)

Creative works
 පහන් වන දා (1961)
 කුමාරතුංග ගේ සමාජ දර්ශනය (1962)
 සිංහල ශබ්දකෝෂ සම්පාදනයට අලුත් ආකල්පයක් (1977)
 හෙවිසි එපා (2007)

Dictionaries
 නූතන සිංහල පාරිභාෂික ශබ්දකෝෂය (1978)
 පරිපාලන ශබ්දකෝෂය (1982)
 ප්රායෝගික සිංහල ශබ්දකෝෂය, කාණ්ඩ I සහ II (1982/84)
 ගුණසේන මහා සිංහල ශබ්දකෝෂය (2005)

Works on Religion and History
 ආගමික නිදහස හා මූලික අයිතිය (2003)
 යක්කු සහ කුවේණිය (2008)

Works on Politics
 ජාතික සටන (1960)
 ජනතා ජයග්රහණයේ අනාගතය (1963)
 ලෝකය රක්නා රාජ්‍ය තන්ත්රය – මහ සම්මතවාදය (1991)
 Mahasammatavada (1992)
 ජාතික අනන්යතාවේ න්යායික පසුබිම (1992)
 නේරු-කොතලාවල ගිවිසුම ක්රියාත්මක කරමු (1993)
 වෙනසක පෙරනිමිති (1995)
 මූලික අයිතිය පෙන්වා උත්තරීතර අයිතිය පැහැර ගැනීම (1996)
 භීෂණයෙන් තොර සමාජයක් (1999)
 මාර සෙනඟ ගේ හා දේවදත්තයන්ගේ වැඩ (2003)
 බුද්ධ ජයන්ති සමය - කුමන්ත්රණ සහ ඝාතන (2012)
 Under Velupillai Prabhakaran (2012)
 ඊළම්‍ කණ්‍ඩවර් සහ අවතාර පුරැෂයා නුදුටු විමුක්‍තිය (2014)
 නේරැ - කොතලාවල ගිවිසුම සහ නිර්මලතා කොමිසම (2015)

Works on Law
 නීති නිඝණ්ඩුව (1998)
 Legal Philosophy in Medieval Sinhale (2008)
 මධ්යකාලීන ලංකාවේ නීතිය (2013)

Works on travel
 සුන්දර කෙන්යාව හෙවත් මාසෛයන් ගේ රට (2002)

Philosophical works
 ඊර්ෂ්යාකාරයා ගේ අණ (2006)
 මනසට දැමූ විලංගු ගැලවීම (2010)
 කාලය වර්තමානය සහ පැතලි ලෝකයේ විශ්‍වාස (2015)

Biographical works
 දැනගත යුතු ම විරල චරිත කීපයක්‍ (2015)

Languages
 බසක ගැටලු (2009)
 සිංහල අකුරු අකාරාදී කිරීම සහ ප්රමිත කිරීම (2003)

See also 
Sinhalaye Mahasammatha Bhoomiputra Pakshaya
Politics of Sri Lanka

References

Further reading 
සිංහල බෞද්ධ චින්තනය ට බලපෑ විජයතුංග සාධකය, Udaya Rajapakshe, S. Godage & Bros., Colombo, 2007

External links 
Book review published in Daily News

1931 births
Living people
Lexicographers
Sinhala-language writers
Sinhalese writers
Sri Lankan non-fiction writers
Alumni of Nalanda College, Colombo
Sinhalese lawyers
Sri Lankan Buddhists
Alumni of the University of Ceylon
Alumni of the University of Kelaniya
People from Western Province, Sri Lanka
Candidates in the 1994 Sri Lankan presidential election
Candidates in the 1999 Sri Lankan presidential election